The western border of Santa Monica, California, is the 3-mile (4.8 km) stretch of Santa Monica Bay. On its other sides, the city is bordered by various districts of Los Angeles: the northwestern border is Pacific Palisades, the eastern border is Brentwood north of Wilshire Boulevard and West Los Angeles south of Wilshire, the northeastern border is generally San Vicente Boulevard up to the Riviera Country Club, the southwestern border is Venice Beach and the southern border is with West Los Angeles and Mar Vista.

Santa Monica Canyon 

Part of the Santa Monica Post Office code 90402 but outside the municipal boundaries, Santa Monica Canyon is an adjacent neighborhood is named for the historic land grant Rancho Boca de Santa Monica. The boundary between Santa Monica and Pacific Palisades in this area is Adelaide Drive.

La Mesa Drive / North of San Vicente 

San Vicente Boulevard is the northernmost major street in Santa Monica. The streets north of San Vicente are generally considered a subsection of the North of Montana neighborhood, but distinguished because of La Mesa Drive. North of San Vicente the streets are La Mesa Drive, La Mesa Way, Gale Place (developed by one of the area's prolific post-depression contractors, Cecil Gale), Woodacres Road, Esparta Way, Ermont Place, Foxtail Drive, Larkin Place, Winnett Place and Adelaide Place. This is part of the "North of Montana"  90402 zip code.

North of Montana Avenue 
South of San Vicente and north of Montana Avenue consist of larger family homes of varying styles and age on larger lots. It is one of the most expensive areas in the Westside of Los Angeles. The streets in this portion of Santa Monica are San Vicente Boulevard, Georgina Avenue, Marguerita Avenue, Alta Avenue, Carlyle Avenue, Brentwood Terrace, Ocean Avenue, and the "numbered streets" 4th Street, 7th Street, Lincoln Boulevard (where 8th Street would have been), 9th Street, 10th Street, 11th Street, 12th Street, Euclid Street (which is where 13th Street would have been), 14th Street, 15th Street (the dividing line for Franklin versus Roosevelt Elementary schools), 16th Street, 17th Street (which is where Gillette's Regent Square tract begins) 18th Street, 19th Street, 20th Street, 21st Street, 21st Place (this is Gillette's cleaver extra street created by eliminating five alleys and narrowing streets, where the Gillette Regent Square tract ends and where 21st and a Half Street would have been), 22nd Street, 23rd Street, 24th Street, 25th Street and 26th Street. The South of San Vicente, North of Montana streets provide an understated conventional walkable play-in-street feel. Among the streets south of San Vicente, the streets west of 7th Street are coveted for their proximity to Palisades Park on the bluffs overlooking the Pacific Ocean and wide streets with stately homes on deep 100' foot wide lots. The Gillette's Regent Square tract, developed by King Gillette - the razor blade manufacturer, are 9,000 square feet on 60' x 150' lots. The Gillette Regent Square section is coveted by potential home buyers for the larger homes allowed under the very restrictive zoning laws, wider lots and mature street trees.  

San Vicente Boulevard is the northernmost major street in Santa Monica. The streets North of San Vicente are generally considered a subsection of the North of Montana neighborhood, but distinguished because of La Mesa Drive. Homes on La Mesa Drive are among the most expensive in Los Angeles County and often contain views of the Riviera Country Club with peeks of the Pacific Ocean or picturesque Santa Monica Canyon. La Mesa Drive is one of the least known in the city. It's planted with a dense canopy of rare Moreton Bay fig trees, making the street a picturesque walking location. Twenty blocks closer to the ocean, the Santa Monica Steps at 4th Street are a popular set of 189 very steep steps that lead down into the canyon.  Rather than being used as a convenient direct route from Canyon Charter School to Adelaide Drive, they are more often utilized for intense workouts and are an excellent place for spotting sweating celebrities. Streets north of San Vicente are usually short and contain gated estates. North of San Vicente the streets are La Mesa Drive, La Mesa Way, Gale Place (developed by one of the area's prolific post-Depression contractors, Cecil Gale), Woodacres Road, Esparta Way, Ermont Place, Foxtail Drive, Larkin Place, Winnett Place and Adelaide Drive. This is part of the "North of Montana"  90402 zip code.

West of 7th and East of Ocean Avenue is the neighborhood noted by 100' x 220' foot lots, some of which have been subdivided into 50 X 220. Many of Santa Monica's historically significant land-marked homes are located here, and a few are designated as such in the National Registry.

North of Montana is served by two highly regarded public elementary schools - Franklin School for the residents on 15th through the west side of 26th, and Roosevelt for the families on 14th Street down to Ocean Avenue.

During Halloween, the streets near 16th Street and Georgina Avenue are packed with trick-or-treaters, partiers and gawkers because residents go all-out in decorating their homes for the holiday. North of Montana is the only Santa Monica neighborhood with a privately funded 24-hour-a-day patrol service managed by the Santa Monica Protective Association. The neighborhood is not represented by an association, but there is an active organized no-growth group. 

North of Montana (Alfred A. Knopf, Inc.) is also the title of the first book in the FBI Special Agent Ana Grey mystery series, written by Santa Monica resident, April Smith. Continuously in print since 1994, North of Montana became notorious for being a fast-paced thriller that also examines complex relationships between upper-class white women and the Hispanic caretakers of their children.

Montana Avenue 
Montana Avenue is home to two elementary schools, a public library, and a mile of about 150 upscale stores, banks, real estate offices and restaurants. There are three Starbucks (one inside Pavilions) two of which are located between 7th St. and 9th St., and one Peet's Coffee among several independently owned cafes and coffee shops, including Caffe Luxxe and Primo Passo Coffee Company. The businesses on this street are generally boutiques, along with two national markets. Montana Avenue is also honored with the 1939 landmark Aero Theater, built by Donald Douglas Company as a continuous around-the-clock movie theater. This is now a repertory theater operated by The American Cinematheque.  Every December and June the Montana Avenue Association hosts a neighborhood-wide sale and festival where stores give holiday discounts, give free samples of food, or have clearance sales to make room for a new season of clothing. Montana Avenue is home to Balloon Celebrations, a place for modern party decor & Luxe Balloon Bouquets. Montana Avenue is served by the 18 line of the Big Blue Bus.

Northeast Neighbors 
North of Wilshire, but South of Montana Avenue, is a primarily residential neighborhood.  Laid out on a consistent grid of numbered streets, there are many mid-sized homes and condominiums.  On its westernmost end this neighborhood includes a number of well-preserved Victorian duplex houses otherwise unique in the city.  Smaller Craftsman era bungalows line the east-west avenues like Idaho, Washington, and California.  At the corner of Washington Avenue and 22nd is the original Gehry House, a deconstructionist masterpiece that signaled a dramatic shift in Frank Gehry's architectural style.  Real estate is exceptionally expensive in this neighborhood, albeit slightly less expensive than the more stately properties north of Montana. The neighborhood is represented by the Northeast Neighbors neighborhood association. www.neneighbors.org

Ocean Avenue 
Ocean Avenue is a major thoroughfare in Santa Monica that runs along Palisades Park, with a view of the Pacific Ocean. Ocean Avenue real estate is highly prized, as all residences have a full view of the beach and Pacific Ocean, some from Palos Verdes all the way to Malibu.  

South of California Ave are several luxury hotels such as Shore Hotel, Ocean View Hotel, Shutters, Casa del Mar, The Shangri-La, The Georgian Hotel, The Huntley, The Fairmont Miramar, Hotel Oceana, The Viceroy and Loews, restaurants, businesses, and homes. The Santa Monica Pier is located at Ocean Avenue and Colorado Avenue.

Downtown Santa Monica 
Downtown Santa Monica is located south of Wilshire Blvd. The streets that make up downtown Santa Monica are Wilshire Boulevard, Arizona Avenue, Santa Monica Boulevard, Broadway, and Colorado Avenue from 2nd street to 14th street. The Third Street Promenade and Santa Monica Place are located in the heart of downtown. Many restaurants, tourist sites and hotels are in downtown Santa Monica.

Midtown Santa Monica 
Comprising most of the 90404 zip code Midtown Santa Monica stretches from 14th street to Centinela at its westernmost and easternmost extremities, and Wilshire Boulevard to Olympic Boulevard in its north and south.  Alternating between major thoroughfares and quieter residential lanes, Midtown is less congested than many other parts of the city.  Planned on a regular grid, Midtown Santa Monica was once home to a number of picturesque Craftsman houses and brightly painted Victorians, though only occasional examples of these can still be found.  In the early 1940s the first wave of suburbanization overtook this part of the city and many preexisting structures were razed and replaced with tiny square California Bungalows with green lawns and small, private backyards.  In the 1960s a large number of these increasingly dilapidated structures were demolished in favor of four and five unit condominium complexes and apartments.  The easternmost edge of Midtown Santa Monica, often referred to as the "college streets" where Princeton, Harvard, Yale, Stanford, and Berkeley intersect with Wilshire Boulevard, represents one of the city's primary gateways.  Commemorating the spot where the cities of Santa Monica and Los Angeles (Brentwood neighborhood) share a border is the "Wave" a sculpture by Tony De Lap arching over Wilshire Boulevard near Franklin.

Pico District 
Before the 1960s, the neighborhood was much larger and was an important African-American enclave on the Westside, but when the Santa Monica Freeway opened in the 1960s, it resulted in the destruction of many residences and the relocation of a large number of families. Its boundaries are Lincoln Blvd to the west, Centinela Ave to the east, Olympic Ave to the north and Pico Blvd to the south. The Santa Monica Freeway runs through the area with access near both Lincoln Boulevard and Olympic Blvd.  Santa Monica High School and Santa Monica College are both on Pico. Pico Blvd in Santa Monica has traffic lights at nearly every block, as well as local and middle class businesses. This is the most ethnically diverse area of Santa Monica, but this diversity is under threat as the area is rapidly becoming gentrified. While the city of Santa Monica has a very low crime rate compared to surrounding communities, the Pico neighborhood has higher crime rates than the rest of the city. The City of Santa Monica has been accused of ignoring the Pico District in the past, particularly when it came to issues regarding crime and gang activity.

Ocean Park Neighborhood 

Located in the southwest corner of Santa Monica, from the beach to Lincoln Boulevard and between Pico Boulevard and the southern city limits, is the Ocean Park neighborhood, also known as SOOP (South Of Ocean Park), and together with the northern portion of Venice, as Dogtown. This neighborhood has a mix of older smaller homes, apartment buildings, large homes near the beach and condos. Several condo towers are located along the beach. The area has a beachy, artsy feel similar in manner to its neighbor Venice Beach. Many Santa Monica residents come to shop/browse on Main Street, home of many boutiques and restaurants.  Main Street also hosts a weekly farmer's market on Sundays.  SMASH (an alternative school) and John Muir elementary schools are located in the neighborhood.  Olympic High, an alternative high school, is also located in the area. The neighborhood association is Ocean Park Association.

Sunset Park Neighborhood 
Sunset Park is a residential neighborhood located between Pico Boulevard and the southern city limits and Lincoln Boulevard and eastern city limits.  It is composed primarily of single-family housing.  Most of the homes are small one-story houses built in the 1940s for workers at the Douglas Aircraft Factory. Remodeled or rebuilt homes are upscale. 

Sunset Park is part of the Santa Monica-Malibu Unified School District. Will Rogers and Grant elementary schools and John Adams Middle School are located in the neighborhood.  Santa Monica College, a two-year community college, is also located in Sunset Park.

Santa Monica Airport, one of the busiest single-runway airports in the nation, is located along the southern borders of the neighborhood. The airport will close at the end of 2028.

Clover Park is a large park in the area with recreation facilities. The neighborhood is represented by the Friends of Sunset Park association.

Thoroughfares 
Major east/west thoroughfares in Santa Monica are San Vicente Boulevard, Wilshire Boulevard, Santa Monica Boulevard,  Olympic Boulevard, Pico Boulevard,  and Ocean Park Boulevard. All of these streets are four lanes in width; however, about half of Ocean Park was recently reduced to two lanes in order to accommodate left-turn lanes. Wilshire Blvd and Santa Monica Blvd contain the most traffic. It is fairly easy to travel east/west in Santa Monica.

Traveling north/south in Santa Monica is considerably slower and more difficult. Most north/south streets in Santa Monica end relatively quickly or fail to yield traffic lights at intersections, making travel difficult during rush hour. The major streets are Ocean Avenue and Lincoln Boulevard which goes to Los Angeles International Airport. These two streets are mostly four lanes and considered major thoroughfares. In particular, Lincoln Blvd becomes congested since it is a main route that leads to the Santa Monica Freeway, Venice, Marina del Rey, and the Los Angeles International Airport. A number of smaller residential streets allow north/south travel through Santa Monica. These streets are: 7th Street from Olympic Blvd to the Pacific Coast Highway, 11th Street from San Vicente Blvd to Dewey Street on the border of Venice, 14th Street and 20th Street  from San Vicente Blvd to Ocean Park Blvd, and 26th Street from San Vicente Blvd to Olympic Blvd, where most traffic diverts to Cloverfield Blvd. 17th Street runs from San Vicente Blvd to the entrance of Santa Monica College on Pico Blvd. All of these streets are only two lanes (with the exception of a brief portion of 20th Street). However, all of these streets encounter traffic lights at all intersections, making travel plausible. One alternate route to reach the Santa Monica Freeway going eastbound is to take Cloverfield Blvd, a short four lane street that begins off Santa Monica Boulevard.

"Envisioning Lincoln" - a short (8.5 minute) documentary on Lincoln Blvd. in Santa Monica can be found on YouTube.

References

External links

Neighborhood associations
Wilshire Montana Neighborhood Coalition, or Wilmont
Friends of Sunset Park
North of Montana Ave Association
Ocean Park Association
Santa Monica Mid City Neighbors
Santa Monica Canyon Civic Association
List of Santa Monica Neighborhood Associations

Santa Monica, California
Neighborhoods in Los Angeles County, California